Julia Beatriz Vial Cuevas (born June 24, 1977 in Santiago) is a Chilean journalist and television presenter.

Career in television 
Julia Vial began her career as a commentator in 2001 on television screens Chilevisión.

In mid-2001 he emigrated to Canal 13, to be part of the television program Pantalla Abierta.

She was on Canal 13 until the end of 2004, in 2006 emigrated to TV channel La Red, to be the host of Intrusos with journalist Gaspar Domínguez (until 2007).

In December 2012, announced in its program output screen Intrusos to migrate the morning of La Red Mañaneros.

Since January 2013, will take over as host of Mañaneros.

Personal life 
Julia Vial is married to Leopoldo Muñoz, who has a daughter who was born with Down syndrome named Julia "Julita" Muñoz Vial.

Filmography

References 

1977 births
Chilean women journalists
Chilean television presenters
Living people
Chilean women television presenters